Manuel Borja Calvar Simón (born 2 April 1981), known as Capi, is a Spanish former footballer who played as a central defender.

Club career
Born in Vigo, Galicia, Capi graduated from RC Celta de Vigo's youth system, making his senior debut with the reserves in the 2000–01 season in the Tercera División. Two years later, he joined neighbouring Ponte Ourense CF also in the fourth tier.

In the summer of 2003, Capi signed for Real Zaragoza, being initially assigned to the B side in the Segunda División B. On 25 April 2004 he made his first-team and La Liga debut, coming on as a substitute in a 4–4 home draw against Sevilla FC. He scored his first professional goal the following 6 March, in the 1–0 home victory over Racing de Santander.

Capi joined Segunda División club Real Murcia in 2006. However, after appearing only once in the first part of the campaign, he moved to Lorca Deportiva CF on loan, signing with UD Las Palmas six months later also on loan. After a third loan stint, with SD Ciudad de Santiago, he was released in August 2009.

In the following years, Capi competed mainly in the third division but also in the fourth, representing Montañeros CF, CD Ourense and Pontevedra CF.

References

External links

1981 births
Living people
Spanish footballers
Footballers from Vigo
Association football defenders
La Liga players
Segunda División players
Segunda División B players
Tercera División players
Divisiones Regionales de Fútbol players
Celta de Vigo B players
Real Zaragoza B players
Real Zaragoza players
Real Murcia players
Lorca Deportiva CF footballers
UD Las Palmas players
CD Ourense footballers
Pontevedra CF footballers